Arkansas Highway 92 is a mostly north–south state highway of  in north-central Arkansas.

Route description

AR 92 begins at US 64 in Plumerville. The route crosses Interstate 40 and continues north through Conway County. A concurrency begins with AR 124 in Springfield and also AR 9 north of Springfield. The AR 9/AR 92/AR 124 concurrency continues north to Center Ridge, when AR 124 turns west, AR 9 heads north, and AR 92 turns east. The highway enters Van Buren County, where it intersects US 65 at Bee Branch and runs near Greers Ferry Lake  before entering Cleburne County. The highway continues east to concur with AR 16, cross Greers Ferry Lake, and enter the community of Greers Ferry. Continuing east, AR 92 winds to Drasco, where the route terminates at AR 5/AR 25.

Major intersections

See also

 List of state highways in Arkansas

References

External links

092
Transportation in Conway County, Arkansas
Transportation in Van Buren County, Arkansas
Transportation in Cleburne County, Arkansas